Computer Quarterback is an American football simulation video game written for the Apple II by Danielle Bunten Berry (credited as Dan Bunten) and published in 1981 by Strategic Simulations. Ports to the Atari 8-bit family and Commodore 64 were released in 1984. Add-on disks for new football seasons were also sold by SSI.

Gameplay
Computer Quarterback is a game in which a statistics-based football game features both playbooks for both semi-pro and professional American football.

Development
In a 1997 interview, Danielle Berry talked about the history of the game:

Reception
Wyatt Lee reviewed the game for Computer Gaming World, and stated that "Team Data Disks for individual seasons have been marketed through the company catalog and this is a very playable game."

Reviews
Tilt - Jun, 1987
Current Notes
Atari Computer Enthusiasts (ACE)
Peelings
Expo Review

References

External links
Review in Softalk (as "Real-Time Football")
Article in Softalk about computer football games
Review in Current Notes
Article in Commodore Power/Play
Article in Electronic Games
Review in Peelings II
Entry in The Guide to Computer Living

1981 video games
American football video games
Apple II games
Atari 8-bit family games
Commodore 64 games
Danielle Bunten Berry games
Real-time strategy video games
Strategic Simulations games
Video games developed in the United States
Video games set in the United States